Näsets SK is a Swedish football club located in Västra Frölunda.

Background
Näsets SK currently plays in Division 4 Göteborg B which is the sixth tier of Swedish football. They play their home matches at the Åkeredsvallen in Västra Frölunda.

The club is affiliated to Göteborgs Fotbollförbund. Näsets SK have competed in the Svenska Cupen on 4 occasions and have played 7 matches in the competition.

Season to season

Footnotes

External links
 Näsets SK – Official website
 Näsets SK on Facebook

Football clubs in Gothenburg
Association football clubs established in 1953
1953 establishments in Sweden
Football clubs in Västra Götaland County